Jung Borochovistim, also known as Jungbor, was a Jewish youth movement named after the Leftist Marxist Zionist ideologue, Ber Borochov. The youth movement was affiliated with Left Poale Zion.

Notes
This article incorporates text from the United States Holocaust Memorial Museum, and has been released under the GFDL.

External links
United States Holocaust Memorial Museum - Resistance in the Smaller Ghettos of Eastern Europe

Jewish socialism
Marxist organizations
Zionist organizations
Zionist youth movements
Labor Zionism